Intelsat 708 was a telecommunications satellite built by the American company Space Systems/Loral for Intelsat. It was destroyed on February 15, 1996 when the Long March 3B launch vehicle failed while being launched from the Xichang Satellite Launch Center in China. The launch vehicle veered off course immediately after liftoff and struck a nearby village, officially killing at least six people.

The accident investigation identified a failure in the guidance system of the Long March 3B. After the Intelsat 708 accident, the Long March rockets greatly increased in reliability and did not experience another mission failure until 2011. However, the participation of American companies in the Intelsat 708 and Apstar 2 investigations caused great political controversy in the United States. A U.S. government investigation found that the information in the report had been illegally transferred to China. Satellite technology was subsequently reclassified as a munition and placed under ITAR restrictions, blocking its export to China. In 2002, Space Systems/Loral paid US$20 million to settle charges of violating export controls.

Launch failure 
In 1992 and 1993, Space Systems/Loral received licenses from the United States Department of State to launch Intelsat satellites on Chinese rockets. At that time, satellite components were still under International Traffic in Arms Regulations (ITAR); they would be transferred in stages to the U.S. Department of Commerce between 1992 and 1996. The Intelsat 708 satellite was to be launched into geostationary orbit aboard a Long March 3B launch vehicle.

On February 15, 1996, the Long March 3B launch vehicle failed during launch, veering off course immediately after liftoff and crashing into a village near the launch site (probably Mayelin Village). An enormous explosion destroyed most of the rocket and killed an unknown number of inhabitants.

The nature and extent of the damage remain a subject of dispute. The Chinese government, through its official Xinhua news agency, reported that six people were killed and 57 injured. Western media speculated that between a few dozen and 500 people might have been killed in the crash; "dozens, if not hundreds", of people were seen to gather outside the centre's main gate near the crash site the night before launch. When reporters were being taken away from the site, they found that most buildings had sustained serious damage or had been flattened completely. Some eyewitnesses were noted as having seen dozens of ambulances and many flatbed trucks, loaded with what could have been human remains, being taken to the local hospital.

Bruce Campbell of Astrotech and other American eyewitnesses in Xichang reported that the satellite post-crash was surprisingly intact, along with the opinion that the official death toll only reflects those in the military who were caught by the disaster and not the civilian population. In the years to follow, the village that used to border the launch center has vanished with little trace it ever existed. However, Chen Lan writing in The Space Review later said the total population of the village was under 1000, and that most if not all of the population had been evacuated before launch as had been common practice since the 1980s, making it "very unlikely" that there were hundreds of deaths.

Investigation 
After the launch failure, the Chinese investigation found that the inertial measurement unit had failed. However, the satellite insurance companies insisted on an Independent Review Committee (IRC) as a condition of providing insurance for future Chinese satellite launches. Loral, Hughes, and other U.S. aerospace companies participated in the Review Committee, which issued a report in May 1996 that identified a different cause of the failure in the inertial measurement unit. The Chinese report was then changed to match the findings of the Review Committee.  As a result of the investigation, the Long March rocket family improved in reliability and did not experience another mission failure until August 2011.

In 1997, the U.S. Defense Technology Security Administration found that China had obtained "significant benefit" from the Review Committee and could improve their "launch vehicles ... ballistic missiles and in particular their guidance systems". In 1998, the U.S. Congress reclassified satellite technology as a munition that was subject to ITAR, returning export control from the Commerce Department to the State Department. In 2002, Loral paid US$20 million in fines and compliance expenses to settle allegations of violating export control regulations.

No export licenses to China have been issued since 1996, and an official at the Bureau of Industry and Security emphasized in 2016 that "no U.S.-origin content, regardless of significance, regardless of whether it's incorporated into a foreign-made item, can go to China".

Intelsat 708 contained sophisticated communications and encryption technology. Members of the Loral security team braved the toxic environment around the crash site to recover sensitive components, returning with complaints of bulging eyes and severe headaches requiring oxygen therapy. They were initially reported by the U.S. Department of Defense monitor to have succeeded in recovering "the [satellite's] encryption-decryption equipment". It later became clear that the most sensitive FAC-3R circuit boards were not recovered, but, "...were mounted near the hydrazine propellant tanks and most likely were destroyed in the explosion... Because the FAC-3R boards on Intelsat 708 were uniquely keyed, the National Security Agency (NSA) remains convinced that there is no risk to other satellite systems, now or in the future, resulting from having not recovering the FAC-3R boards from the PRC".

See also 

 Nedelin disaster: in 1960, the worst space launch catastrophe prior to Intelsat 708 occurred at the Baikonur test range in the former Soviet Union.
 Proton-M/DM-03 8K82 km/11S861-03: in 2013, a Proton launch vehicle went out of control moments after launch and flew horizontally for a few seconds before crashing some distance from the pad.

References 

   (Congressional report discussing Intelsat 708 launch failure and possible technology transfer)
  (Documents on Intelsat 708 and export controls, including State Department letter charging two companies with export law violations)
  (Article on the crash of a rocket carrying a commercial payload on 15 February 1996)
  (Chinese government report disputing conclusions of U.S. Congressional report)
 Video of launch, impact and view of destruction of town by resulting explosion.

External links 

 Long March Rocket Explodes - 長征火箭爆炸 长征火箭爆炸, Raw footage of the disaster
 https://www.youtube.com/watch?v=DZTFgZ9zl74&t=170s, Extra footage of disaster in detail

Satellite launch failures
Space program fatalities
Spacecraft launched in 1996
Intelsat satellites
1996 in China
Satellites using the SSL 1300 bus